Kiler is a Turkish group of companies whose flagship operation is a large supermarket chain.

History
From 1984 members of the Kiler family opened a number of supermarkets in the Istanbul area, which in 1994 were incorporated as Kiler Supermarket Gıda Sanayi ve Tic. A.Ş. By 2004 the group had 33 stores in the Istanbul area and acquired chains of supermarkets in other parts of Turkey. By 2010 Kiler had 172 shops in 26 cities. Shops range from 600 to 2,500 m2

The supermarkets are the central business interest of Kiler Holding, which consists of 22 companies with more than 5,000 employees, operating in the retail trade, real estate development, tourism and health sectors. Since 2000 the real estate interests of the group have been managed by a separate company, Kiler Gayrimenkul, and more recently for development as residential buildings and shopping centres. The flagship project of Kiler GYO is the Istanbul Sapphire skyscraper.

References

External links
 

Turkish companies established in 1986
Retail companies established in 1986
Retail companies of Turkey